Epic is a genre of narrative defined by heroic or legendary adventures presented in a long format. Originating in the form of epic poetry, the genre also now applies to epic theatre, epic films, music, novels, stage play, television series, and video games. Scholars argue that 'the epic' has long since become "disembedded" from its origins in oral poetry.

History

Ancient sources 
Providing a plethora of narrative tropes, the Mesopotamian Epic of Gilgamesh, as the first recorded epic poem, would lay the foundation for the entire Western branch of the genre. Both the Old Testament and New Testament borrow many themes from Gilgamesh, which in turn has been found to draw from older Sumerian tradition. As such, some anthropologists identify Jesus as an embodiment of the same mythical archetype. Some similarities, among others, include stories of:

 the universal flood:
 Utnapishtim in the Mesopotamian story
 Noah in the Judeo-Christian story

 the 'tree of life' and the Garden of Eden:
 Enkidu and Shamhat in Gilgamesh.
 Adam and Eve in the Bible.

 the hero versus a divine assailant:
 Gilgamesh vs Enkidu
 Jacob vs the angel

Just as it provided a blueprint for biblical traditions, many other pre-Christian mythos and religious epics have also shown to be influenced by Gilgamesh, including  those of Buddha in Buddhist tradition; Krishna in Hindu tradition; Odysseus, Perseus, and Dionysus in Greek tradition; Ra, Horus, Osiris, and Amenhotep III in Ancient Egyptian tradition; Romulus in Roman tradition; and Zoroaster/Zarathustra and Mithra in Zoroastrian tradition.

The Bible similarly extended its influence into existing epic literature such as the legend of King Arthur, which, as it exists in the modern day, has been interpreted to be loosely modeled upon the life of Jesus, however this was not always the case. Arthurian literature had originally been based on pre-Christian, Celtic folklore and may have been based on a British warrior (5th–6th century) who staved off invading Saxons. During the early christianization of the United Kingdom, the Church tolerated new converts observing their older, pagan traditions. However, as the British Church grew in power, events taking place in Europe (such as The Crusades) inspired authors to reshape the traditional legends with christian undertones. Author Robert de Boron, for instance, translated the legend into French in 1155, in which he would conceive of the now-iconic addition of the sword-in-the-stone legend, and would expand upon the Round Table lore whereby Arthur had twelve knights just as Jesus has twelve disciples.

Modernity 
Specific echelons of popular culture draw from a variety of epic narrative tropes. This may preclude to genres such as heroic fantasy, sword and sorcery, space opera, fantasy adventures, and high fantasy. Some even draw influence from each other, just as ancient sources. For example Frank Herbert's Dune Saga inspired the Star Wars trilogy and the Jodoverse.

Genres
There are many genres of epic and various mediums that have adopted such genres, including:

 Epic film: encompasses historical epics, religious epics, and western epics. However, such commonly been broken further into subgenres, 
 Female epic: examines ways in which female authors have adapted the masculine epic tradition to express their own heroic visions. 
 Chivalric epics from the Middle Ages.
 National epics. 

Real-life stories of heroic figures have also been referred to as being epic. For example, Ernest Shackleton's exploration adventures in Antarctica.

Epic fantasy 
Epic fantasy (or high fantasy) has been described as containing three elements: 

 it must be a trilogy or longer;
 its time-span must encompass years or more; and
 it must contain a large back-story or universe setting in which the story takes place. 

J. R. R. Tolkien's The Lord of the Rings is an example of epic fantasy, though the genre is not limited to the Western tradition, for example: Arabic epic literature includes One Thousand and One Nights; and Indian epic poetry includes Ramayana and Mahabharata.

References

Further reading

Merchant, Paul. 1971. The Epic. Routledge Kegan & Paul. .